Arik is a given name, and may refer to:

In sports:

Arik Benado, the captain of Maccabi Haifa
Arik Gilbert (born 2002), American football player
Ariel "Arik" Zeevi, Israeli judoka

In music:

Arik Einstein, Israeli singer
Arik Marshall, American musician

In other fields:
Arik Air, Nigerian airline
Ariel Sharon, former Israeli Prime Minister and military leader 
Arik Levy, Industrial designer and contemporary artist
Artoces of Iberia, an ancient Georgian ruler
Arik Ascherman, American-born Reform rabbi and Palestinian human rights activist in Israel
Arik Brauer, visionary artist
Arik Soong, fictional geneticist and later cyberneticist
Arık, Kargı

Jewish given names
Masculine given names